The Überlendner-Siedlung is a village in Upper Austria, Austria. Part of the municipality of Gramastetten, it is located a few kilometres from Walding.

References

Cities and towns in Urfahr-Umgebung District